Troy Loggins (born July 21, 1995) is an American professional ice hockey forward who is currently  playing for HC Nové Zámky of the Slovak Extraliga.

Playing career

Junior
During the 2014–15 season, Loggins recorded 14 goals and 21 assists in 57 games for the Sioux Falls Stampede. During the Clark Cup playoffs, Loggins recorded 10 goals and six assists in 12 games to help lead the Stampede to win the Clark Cup. He was subsequently named Clark Cup MVP.

College
Loggins began his collegiate career for the Northern Michigan Wildcats during the 2015–16 season. He recorded three assists in 16 games, before suffering an injury. During the 2016–17 season, he recorded 10 goals and six assists in 38 games for the Wildcats. He recorded his first collegiate goal on October 7, 2016, in a game against Wisconsin.

During the 2017–18 season, he recorded a career-high 23 goals and 24 assists in 43 games. In Game 3 of the WCHA Semifinals, Loggins scored the overtime winner against Bowling Green to send Northern Michigan to their first conference championship game since their 2-1 loss against Michigan in the 2010 CCHA Championship. His 23 goals tied for ninth-most in the NCAA. Following his outstanding season, he was named to the All-WCHA First Team. During the 2018–19 season, Loggins was WCHA scoring champion with 32 points on a league-high 20 goals and 12 assists in 28 league games. He finished the season with a career-high tying 23 goals and led the team in points (40), goals per game (0.59), points per game (1.03), and shots on goal per game (3.97). He led the WCHA in power play goals (10) and shorthanded goals (3), and led the NCAA in shots on goal (155). He recorded his first career hat-trick on March 1, 2019, in a game against Michigan Tech. Following his outstanding season, he was named WCHA Offensive Player of the Year, and named to the All-WCHA First Team, and AHCA/CCM Second Team All-American.

Professional
On March 20, 2019, Loggins signed a three-year contract with the Grand Rapids Griffins of the American Hockey League (AHL). On October 22, 2019, the Griffins assigned Loggins to the Toledo Walleye of the ECHL. In his first full professional season, Loggins recorded two assists in five games for the Griffins, and 11 goals and 14 assists in 45 games for the Walleye.

Career statistics

Awards and honors

References

External links
 

1995 births
Living people
Ice hockey players from California
Grand Rapids Griffins players
Northern Michigan Wildcats men's ice hockey players
Sioux Falls Stampede players
Sportspeople from Huntington Beach, California
Toledo Walleye players
AHCA Division I men's ice hockey All-Americans
HC Nové Zámky players
American expatriate ice hockey players in Slovakia
American expatriate ice hockey players in Sweden